The 1930 Carnegie Tech Tartans football team represented the Carnegie Institute of Technology—now known as Carnegie Mellon University—as an independent during the 1930 college football season. Led by 16th-year head coach Walter Steffen, the Tartans compiled a record of 6–3. Carnegie Tech played home games at Pitt Stadium in Pittsburgh.

Schedule

References

Carnegie Tech
Carnegie Mellon Tartans football seasons
Carnegie Tech Tartans football